Judy Clark (June 9, 1921 – December 27, 2002) was an American film and television actress and singer. Clark adopted a brash and energetic singing style, similar to that of musical-comedy star Betty Hutton (with trade critics almost always comparing the blonde Clark to the blonde Hutton).

Early life 
Clark was the daughter of Jack Kaufman, who was a vaudeville performer. She and comedian Jack Gilford were among the new faces in the stage show Meet the People; Universal Pictures signed both for the Gloria Jean musical Reckless Age (1944).

Clark won the juvenile lead in the 1944 Benny Fields musical Minstrel Man, in which she delivered two songs in the Hutton manner. The role reflected Clark's own life, as a rising star in a theatrical family. She continued to work in pictures through the mid-1940s, including the Joan Davis musical comedy Beautiful but Broke (1944), the Cinderella-styled comedy The Kid Sister (1945), the Freddie Stewart musical Junior Prom (1946), In Fast Company with The Bowery Boys (1946), and the Jean Porter musical Two Blondes and a Redhead (1947). Beginning in 1949, with fewer musicals being made, she worked in the action/adventure field, in two serials, Bruce Gentry and Desperadoes of the West. Altogether she appeared in more than two dozen films and several television productions.

Stage 
Clark's work as a singer included performing with Jimmy McHugh's Hollywood Singing Stars. She also danced and sang in the stage musical Lend an Ear at the Las Palmas Theater.

Personal life 
On October 1, 1949, Clark married businessman George Myers in Los Angeles. They were divorced on July 14, 1950. She later was married to William Jerome Otto, heir to a drug chain.

Filmography 

 South of Santa Fe (1942) 
 Chatterbox (1943) 
 Swing Your Partner (1943) 
 Beautiful But Broke (1944) 
 Career Girl (1944) 
 Hey, Rookie (1944) 
 Minstrel Man (1944) 
 Reckless Age (1944) 
 Stars on Parade (1944) 
 This Is the Life (1944) 
 Night Club Girl (1945) 
 Penthouse Rhythm (1945) 
 The Kid Sister (1945) 
 The Strange Affair of Uncle Harry (1945) 
 In Fast Company (1946) 
 Junior Prom (1946) 
 That's My Gal (1947) 
 Two Blondes and a Redhead (1947) 
 Bruce Gentry – Daredevil of the Skies (1949) 
 Desperadoes of the West (1950) 
 The Girl on the Bridge (1951) 
 The Crooked Web (1955) 
 House of Women (1962)

References

External links 

 
Interview with Mike Fitzgerald

American film actresses
American television actresses
1921 births
2002 deaths
Actresses from New York (state)
People from Rockville Centre, New York
20th-century American actresses
Singers from New York (state)
20th-century American singers
20th-century American women singers